Crithe is a genus of minute sea snails, marine gastropod mollusks or micromollusks in the family Cystiscidae. This genus is sometimes still placed within the Marginellidae.

These tiny gastropods have a shell which is colorless and is transparent when fresh.

Distribution
This genus is found in the Indo-Pacific.

Shell description
Shell minute to small, white, hyaline; spire usually immersed, rarely low; lip thickened, smooth, lacking denticulation; external varix absent; siphonal notch absent; posterior notch absent; columella multiplicate, with 6-8 plications plus parietal lirae, plications usually excavated inside aperture due to collabral parietal callus ridge.

Species
Species within the genus Crithe include:
Crithe algoensis (Smith, 1901)
Crithe atomaria Gould, 1860
Crithe caledonica Boyer, 2003
Crithe cassidiformis Boyer, 2018
Crithe cossinea Cossignani, 1997
Crithe gofasi Boyer, 2003
Crithe huna  (Kay, 1979) 
Crithe marianoi Cossignani, 2001
Crithe nanaoensis (Habe, 1951)
Crithe nipponica (Habe, 1951)
Crithe togatulus Boyer, 2018

References 

  1995. Revision of the Supraspecific Classification of Marginelliform Gastropods. The Nautilus 109(2 & 3):43-110.  (latest family review)

 
Cystiscidae